Ernest Micek (born February 18, 1936) is an American businessman. He was the chairman and chief executive officer of Cargill from 1995 to 1999.

Biography

Early life
Ernest S. Micek was born on February 18, 1936, in Arcadia, Wisconsin. He attended the University of Wisconsin–Madison, where he graduated with a BS degree in chemical engineering in 1959.

Career
In 1995, Micek succeeded Whitney MacMillan as chairman and chief executive officer of Cargill, working in those capacities until 1999.

References

1936 births
Living people
People from Arcadia, Wisconsin
University of Wisconsin–Madison College of Engineering alumni
Businesspeople from Minnesota
Businesspeople from Wisconsin
American chief executives of Fortune 500 companies
Cargill people